The Bournemouth typhoid outbreak was an outbreak of typhoid in 1936 in the south coast of England, a traditional holiday location. It occurred during the months of August and September. The first cases were traced to raw milk from a dairy supplied by a farm whose cows drank water from a river contaminated by sewage from a cottage where a typhoid carrier lived. 718 people became infected, including 200 visitors and 518 residents.

References

1936 in England
1936 disease outbreaks
August 1936 events
September 1936 events
20th century in Hampshire
Typhoid fever
Typhoid
Disease outbreaks in England